The Upper Park Creek Patrol Cabin in Glacier National Park is a rustic backcountry log cabin. Built in 1928, the cabin has a single room. The cabin was built to National Park Service design G913, and adaptation of cabins used at Yellowstone National Park, which had been modeled on those used by the U.S. Forest Service, which in turn were derivations of backwoods trappers' cabins. The Upper Park Creek cabin was more difficult than most to construct, due to its high, remote location.

References

Park buildings and structures on the National Register of Historic Places in Montana
Government buildings completed in 1928
Log cabins in the United States
Ranger stations in Glacier National Park (U.S.)
Rustic architecture in Montana
1928 establishments in Montana
National Register of Historic Places in Flathead County, Montana
Log buildings and structures on the National Register of Historic Places in Montana
National Register of Historic Places in Glacier National Park